The 2021–22 Santa Clara Broncos men's basketball team represented Santa Clara University during the 2021–22 NCAA Division I men's basketball season. The Broncos were led by sixth-year head coach Herb Sendek and played their home games at the Leavey Center as members of the West Coast Conference. They finished the season 21–12, 10–5 in WCC play to finish in third place. They defeated Portland in the third round of the WCC tournament before losing in the semifinals to Saint Mary's. They received an invitation to the National Invitation Tournament, where they lost in the first round to Washington State.

Previous season
In a season limited due to the ongoing COVID-19 pandemic, the Broncos finished the 2020–21 season 12–8, 4–5 in WCC play to finish in sixth place. They defeated Portland and Pacific in the WCC tournament before losing in the quarterfinals to Pepperdine.

Departures

Incoming Transfers

Recruiting

Recruiting class of 2022

Roster

Schedule and results

|-
!colspan=9 style=| Non-conference regular season

|-
!colspan=9 style=| WCC regular season

|-
!colspan=9 style=| WCC tournament

 
|-
!colspan=9 style=| NIT

Source:

References

Santa Clara Broncos men's basketball seasons
Santa Clara
Santa Clara
Santa Clara
Santa Clara